Sekharipuram Narayanan Subrahmanyan (born 16 March 1960) is the Chief Executive Officer & Managing Director of Larsen & Toubro. He took over the reins from Mr Anil Manibhai Naik on 1 July 2017. S N Subrahmanyan is also the Vice Chairman on the Boards of LTI and L&T Technology Services, Non-Executive Chairman of L&T Metro Rail (Hyderabad) Limited and Vice Chairman of the Indian multinational IT and outsourcing company, Mindtree acquired March 2019.  In February 2021, he was appointed Chairman of the National Safety Council (NSC) for three years by the Union Ministry of Labour & Employment. In this role, SNS will guide the NSC, which has a major part to play to ensure safety in workplaces under the new Occupational Safety, Health and Working Conditions Code, 2020 (OSH Code, 2020). In February 2022, The Board of Directors of L&T Finance Holdings Ltd. (LTFH), approved the appointment of S. N. Subrahmanyan as the Director and Chairperson of the Board.

Early life 
Born in Chennai, Tamil Nadu S N Subrahmanyan's father, late Sri S S Narayanan was a General Manager with the Indian Railways. He studied at Vidya Mandir Senior Secondary School, Mylapore in Chennai and completed his graduation in Civil Engineering from Regional Engineering College Kurukshetra (Presently National Institute of Technology, Kurukshetra or NIT Kurukshetra), Kurukshetra University in 1982.

He pursued a Masters in Business Administration from Symbiosis Institute of Business Management, Pune, the University of Poona followed by an Executive Management Programme from the London Business School.

Career 
S N Subrahmanyan joined the ECC Division of Larsen & Toubro in 1984 and began working with leaders like Cheyur Ramaswamy Ramakrishnan (former Joint Managing Director, L&T), A Ramakrishna (former President & Deputy Managing Director, L&T) and K V Rangaswami (former President, ECC).

In July 2011, S N Subrahmanyan was appointed as full-time Director on the L&T Board and designated as Member of the Board and Senior Executive Vice President (Construction). In October 2015, he was designated Deputy Managing Director & President, L&T. In 2017, he was promoted to the role of Chief Executive Officer and Managing Director of Larsen & Toubro (L&T) by the company's board of directors.

Awards and recognition 

 Best CEO in the Infrastructure Sector of the Fortune India Best CEOs 2022
 Best CEO in the Infrastructure & Engineering category of the BT-PwC India’s Best CEOs ranking 2022. 
 Featured in the Top 50 Utilities Leaders In The GCC 2021
 Appointed as Chairman of National Safety Council by Labour Ministry
Ranked 11 in the Construction Week magazine Power 100 Ranking for 2021
CEO of the year(pvt) 2019 by CNBC - Awaaz
 Emergent Award at the CEO Awards 2019 for exemplary leadership.
 Ranked 13 in the Construction Week magazine Power 100 Ranking for 2019.
 Recognized with the IIM-JRD Tata Award by the Indian Institute of Metallurgy (IIM) in 2019 for his "service to the country through leadership in the industry, corporate governance and fulfilling societal responsibilities."
 ‘Contractor CEO of the Year’ at Qatar Contractors Forum & Awards function in 2014
 Ranked 36th in the ‘2014 Construction Week Power 100’
 Leading Engineering Personality award at ‘Glimpses of Engineering Personalities’ by the Institution of Engineers (India) in 2014
 Recognized as the ‘Infrastructure Person of the Year – 2012’ by Construction Week (CW) magazine.

Personal life 
S N Subrahmanyan is married to Mrs Meena Subrahmanyan, a Postgraduate in Economics and a Gold Medalist from Stella Maris College, Madras University. The couple have two sons, Sujay and Suraj. He also has a keen interest in Western Classical music and cricket.

References 

Indian chief executives
Businesspeople from Chennai
1960 births
Living people
Larsen & Toubro